Bres is one of four parishes (administrative divisions) in Taramundi, a municipality within the province and autonomous community of Asturias, in northern Spain.  

Villages and hamlets
 Arrojo 
 Bres
 Cabaza
 Entorcisa 
 Freije 
 Galiñeiros 
 Leiras
 Lóutima
 Mazo de Bres
 Silvallana
 Teixo

Parishes in Taramundi